Knuckey Lagoon is an outer suburban area in Darwin. Its Local Government Area is the Litchfield Municipality. The suburb is mostly a rural area, on the fringe of Metropolitan Darwin. The area was named by Surveyor General G W Goyder after his Senior Surveyor,  Richard Randall Knuckey.

References

External links

https://web.archive.org/web/20110629040718/http://www.nt.gov.au/lands/lis/placenames/origins/greaterdarwin.shtml#k#k

Suburbs of Darwin, Northern Territory